Elbert L. "Ickey" Woods (born February 28, 1966) is an American former football player who was a running back for the Cincinnati Bengals of the National Football League (NFL) from 1988 through 1991. He played college football at the University of Nevada, Las Vegas. He is best remembered for his "Ickey Shuffle" end zone dance, performed each time he scored a touchdown. After a rookie season in which he set numerous rookie franchise records, a series of injuries shortened his NFL career and he retired after four years.

Early life
Elbert Woods was given the nickname "Ickey" based on his little brother's pronunciation of his given first name, which sounded like "E-E." He attended Edison High School in Fresno, California, where he played sports. He received one college football scholarship, from the University of Nevada, Las Vegas (UNLV), where he was a four-year letterwinner for the UNLV Rebels. As a freshman in 1984, the Rebels, led by future NFL star quarterback Randall Cunningham, went 11-2 and won the California Bowl 30-13 against the Toledo Rockets, a game in which Woods rushed nine times for 53 yards and one touchdown.

In his senior year of 1987,  he broke out and led the nation in rushing with 1,658 yards, with 6.4 yards per attempt. That total remains the second-most in UNLV history, and he still holds the school record in single-game rushing attempts with 37 in two different games. In one of those games, he ran for a personal-best 265 yards against the University of the Pacific. He rushed for more than 100 yards in nine games, and more than 200 yards three times, in 1987, and was named first-team All Big West. He was inducted into the UNLV Athletic Hall of Fame in 1998.

Professional career

The Cincinnati Bengals of the National Football League (NFL) in the second round, drafted Woods with the 31st overall selection, of the 1988 NFL Draft. He was a breakout star as a rookie, setting franchise rookie records for rushing with 1,066 yards (since broken by Corey Dillon), 15 touchdowns, and an NFL-leading 5.3 yards per carry, along with 228 yards and three touchdowns in the playoffs as the Bengals advanced to Super Bowl XXIII. His team lost the game 20-16 to the San Francisco 49ers, but he finished as the game's leading rusher with 79 yards.

In 1989, Woods tore his left anterior cruciate ligament (ACL) in the second game of the season, a 41-10 victory over the Pittsburgh Steelers. He missed 13 months. By the time he returned, his starting role was filled by Harold Green.

In 1991, Woods injured his right knee in the preseason. He returned at midseason but he ran for just 97 yards on 36 carries. He was out of football by age 26. His career statistics include 332 carries for 1,525 yards and 27 touchdowns, along with 47 receptions for 397 yards. Woods was later named #7 on NFL Top 10's Top Ten One-Shot Wonders.

's NFL off-season, Ickey Woods held at least 30 Bengals franchise records, including:
 Rush Attempts: playoffs (89), playoff season (72 in 1988), playoff game (29 on 1989-01-08 BUF)
 Rush Yards: playoffs (391), playoff season (307 in 1988)
 Rush Yds/Att: playoffs (4.39), rookie season (5.25 in 1988)
 Rushing TDs: season/rookie season (15 in 1988), playoffs (4), playoff season (3 in 1988), playoff game (2 on 1989-01-08 BUF)
 Rush Yds/Game: playoffs (78.2)
 Total TDs: playoffs (4), playoff season (3 in 1988), playoff game (2 on 1989-01-08 BUF), rookie season (15 in 1988)
 Yds from Scrimmage: playoffs (409), playoff season (307 in 1988)
 All Purpose Yds: playoffs (409), playoff season (307 in 1988)
 100+ yard rushing games: season (7 in 1988, with Cedric Benson), playoffs (2), rookie season (7)
 Games with 1+ TD scored: playoffs (3), rookie season (11)
 Games with 2+ TD scored: season/rookie season (6 in 1988), playoff game (1; with Charles Alexander, Dan Ross, Stanley Wilson)
 Games with 3+ TD scored: rookie season (1; with three others)

Personal life

Woods is the longtime owner/coach of the Cincinnati Sizzle of the full-contact Women's Football Alliance; one of the players was his ex-wife, Chandra Baldwin-Woods. He runs the Ickey Woods Youth Foundation as well as the Jovante Woods Foundation, named for their son who died at age 16. Jovante was an honor student and a member of the Princeton High School football team who suffered a fatal asthma attack at home. The foundation provides funding and education for asthma research and organ donor education.

Woods has six children. Since retiring from the NFL, he has been a sales representative for a meat company, sold security systems, and has owned a flooring store in Cincinnati. In 2006, he was an assistant coach for the Cincinnati Marshals of the National Indoor Football League.

Ickey Woods appeared in Bootsy Collins' video "Who-Dey Invasion." He appeared in a Cincinnati Bell commercial, doing the "Ickey Shuffle" with the company's president and was in a national Oldsmobile commercial doing the "Ickey Shuffle" with his mother. In 2014, he was featured in a national GEICO Insurance commercial in which he reprised his "Ickey Shuffle" while gleefully buying cold cuts at a deli counter. On May 1, 2015, Woods announced at the Auditorium Theatre in Chicago, Illinois that the Cincinnati Bengals had selected offensive tackle Jake Fisher of the University of Oregon as the 21st pick in the second round (53rd overall) of the 2015 NFL Draft. After replicating his signature move, the "Ickey Shuffle" and making the pick announcement, Woods said, "gonna get me some cold cuts," a line from the aforementioned GEICO television commercial. He also appeared in a couple of commercials before Super Bowl XLIX. The dance move is occasionally duplicated by other NFL players.

References

External links

Career Stats
Catching Up With... Bengals running back Ickey samaj (1997)
Ickey Woods - Realizing His True Calling (2006)

1966 births
Living people
American football running backs
Cincinnati Bengals players
Players of American football from California
Sportspeople from Fresno, California
UNLV Rebels football players